José Antonio Justicia Perales (born 6 January 1989) is a Spanish darts player.

Career

Justicia started his career in 2009 and participated in PDPA Players Championship events in Gibraltar and Nuland. At the end of the year, he attempted to qualify through PDC World Spain Qualifying Event for 2010 PDC World Darts Championship, but lost in the quarterfinal phase to Francisco Ruiz. Next years he participated mainly in soft-tip darts and became a European champion in Soft Tip Bullshooter European Championship 2012. He appeared in several other PDPA Players Championship events in 2011 and 2012, in Germany, Netherlands and Spain.

Between 2012 and 2018 Justicia played soft-tip darts, reaching quarterfinal of Soft Tip Dartslive Las Vegas in 2016.

In January 2018 he tried to win the Tour card in PDC and reached the final of the tournament on Day 3, where he lost to Tytus Kanik. After reaching the last 16 on the final day, Justicia gained his Tour card via PDC Q-School Order of Merit. During one of the UK Open Qualifier tournaments, Justicia was pushed by Adrian Lewis and players had to be separated by stewards. On 2 February 2018 the Darts Regulation Authority ("DRA") released a statement that Lewis would be suspended with immediate effect pending an appeal following an incident with Justicia in the first UK Open qualifier. On 8 February 2018, Lewis was given a three-month ban suspended for six months after Lewis admitted he broke DRA rules.

In March, he played his first major tournament, the 2018 UK Open, where he lost 2–6 in the second round against Joe Cullen. In April, Justicia qualified for his first European Tour event, playing PDC German Open. Later on during the year, he also qualified for the 2018 International Darts Open. He was unable to qualify for the 2019 PDC World Darts Championship via PDC Pro Tour Order of Merit, and he was eliminated in the quarterfinal of PDC World South West European Qualifying Event.

Justicia played on 2019 UK Open and won his first major tournament match, when he won 6–2 over Kevin Thoburn. In the last 96 he lost in the deciding leg 5–6 to Ricky Evans. In April, he reached quarterfinal of PDPA Players Championship Barnsley, marking his career best at that time. In June, he qualified for PDC Danish Open, where he got eliminated in the first round.

After winning the South West Europe Qualifier, Justicia secured his debut at 2020 PDC World Darts Championship. He played Arron Monk in the first round and won 3–0. In the second round, Justicia faced the 17th seed, Stephen Bunting, to whom he lost 2–3 on sets. After the tournament, Justicia placed 82nd in PDC Order of Merit and lost his Tour card.

In January 2020, Justicia entered PDC Q-School, trying to regain his Tour card. Despite reaching the quarterfinal on Day 4, he was unable to get the card. He switched to the PDC Challenge Tour and was also participating in online darts.

In 2021, he failed to get the Tour card in PDC EU Q-school and continued on PDC Challenge Tour. Justicia won the 7th tournament of the year, in Niedernhausen, and won his first title on this circuit. In September, he represented Spain in the 2021 PDC World Cup of Darts alongside Jesús Noguera, where they lost in a deciding leg against the South African team of Devon Petersen and Carl Gabriel.

In January 2022, Justicia entered EU Q-school and on Day 1 in the final he whitewashed Mario Vandenbogaerde 6–0 to secure his PDC Tour Card and ensured his return to the professional circuit. He reached the third round of the 2022 UK Open, where he lost in a deciding leg to Adam Gawlas, despite hitting a nine-dart finish during the match.

World Championship results

PDC
 2020: Second round (lost to Stephen Bunting 2–3)
 2023: First round (lost to Josh Rock 1–3)

Performance timeline

PDC

PDC European Tour

References

External links

José Justicia player profile at Mastercaller

Spanish darts players
Living people
1989 births
Professional Darts Corporation current tour card holders